An iconoclast is one who professes iconoclasm (the belief in the importance of the destroying physical religious images); one who objects to the use of sacred images in religion, or who opposes orthodoxy and religion.

Iconoclast(s) may also refer to:

Film and television 

 Iconoclasts (TV series), a 2005 Sundance Channel show
 Iconoclast, 2011 documentary film about Boyd Rice; directed by Larry Wessel

Music
Iconoclast (band), since 1987, an American jazz duo

Albums

 Iconoclast (Part 1: The Final Resistance), 2008 studio album by Heaven Shall Burn, a German extreme metal band
Iconoclast trilogy, trilogy of Heaven Shall Burn productions
 Iconoclast (Dope Knife album), 2014 album by Rap artist Dope Knife
 Iconoclast (Nazxul album), 2009 studio album by Nazxul, an Australian black metal band
 Iconoclast (Symphony X album), 2011 album by American progressive metal band Symphony X
Iconoclast (EP), 2014 EP by Clinton Sparks

Songs
 "Iconoclast", a song on Emerson, Lake and Palmer's 1971 album Tarkus

Other uses 
 Iconoclasm, a pro wrestling move
 Iconoclast, c. 1853, a pen-name of the political activist and atheist Charles Bradlaugh
 Iconoclast: A Neuroscientist Reveals How to Think Differently, a book by Gregory Berns, published in 2008
 Iconoclasts (video game), 2018 platform game

See also
 Ao-Iconoclast / Pigeon-The Green-ey'd Monster, 2009 maxi single by J-pop singer Kotoko
Eikonoklastes, 1649 book by Milton